The Antennulariellaceae are a family of fungi in the Ascomycota, class Dothideomycetes. The family was named by Nikolai Nikolaevich Woronichin in 1925 to contain the genus Antennulariella that he had described a decade earlier in 1915. Species in the family have a widespread distribution, and are found in warm temperate to tropical locations, where they grow as black sooty molds on plants.

References

Capnodiales
Dothideomycetes families
Lichenicolous fungi